Mrabet or M'rabet is a North-African surname. It may refer to
Haitham Mrabet (born 1980), Tunisian football midfielder
Marouane M'rabet (born 1985), Tunisian volleyball player
Mohamed Mrabet (born 1936), Moroccan author 
Mohamed Mrabet (canoeist) (born 1990), Tunisian sprint canoeist
Oussama Mrabet (born 1993), French football player of Tunisian descent 
Taki Mrabet (born 1989), Tunisian swimmer

See also
Oulad M'Rabet, a town in Morocco